Cagny is the name of two communes in France:

Cagny, Calvados
Cagny, Somme

See also
 Cagney, a surname